Fresna is a genus of skippers in the family Hesperiidae. They are commonly known as Acraea skippers.

Species
Fresna carlo Evans, 1937
Fresna cojo (Karsch, 1893)
Fresna jacquelinae Collins & Larsen, 2003
Fresna maesseni Miller, 1971
Fresna netopha (Hewitson, 1878)
Fresna nyassae (Hewitson, 1878)

References

External links
Natural History Museum Lepidoptera genus database
Seitz, A. Die Gross-Schmetterlinge der Erde 13: Die Afrikanischen Tagfalter. Plate XIII 78 h

Astictopterini
Hesperiidae genera